Cheikh Hamidou Kane (born 2 April 1928) is a Senegalese writer best known for his 1961 novel L'Aventure ambiguë (Ambiguous Adventure), about the interactions of western and African cultures. Its hero is a Fulani boy who goes to study in France, where he loses touch with his Islamic faith and his Senegalese roots. The novel was awarded the Grand prix littéraire d'Afrique noire in 1962.

Biography
Born in Matam, Senegal, Kane had a traditional Muslim education, before going to Paris, France, to study law at the Sorbonne, subsequently receiving degrees in law and philosophy from the École Nationale de la France d'Outre-Mer. In 1959, he returned to Senegal and served in the government. He also worked in Lagos, Nigeria, and in Abidjan, Ivory Coast, as an official of UNICEF.

His autobiographical novel L'Aventure ambiguë was published in 1961, winning the Grand Prix Littéraire d'Afrique Noire the following year. His next novel, Les gardiens du temple, was published in 1995.

Kane was awarded the 2019 Grand Prix des Mécènes.

References

External links

 Video interview with Cheikh Hamidou Kane
 Anecdotal biography of Cheikh Hamidou Kane

Senegalese novelists
1928 births
People of French West Africa
Living people